Captal de Buch (later Buché from Latin capitalis, "first", "chief") was a medieval feudal title in Gascony held by Jean III de Grailly among others.

According to Du Cange, the designation captal (capital, captau, capitau) was applied loosely to the more illustrious nobles of Aquitaine, counts, viscounts, &c., probably as capitales domini, "principal lords", though he quotes more fanciful explanations. As an actual title, the word was used only by the seigneurs of Trene, Puychagut, Epernon and Buch.

Buch was a strategically located town and port on the Atlantic, in the bay of Arcachon. 

When Pierre, the seigneur of Grailly (ca 1285 – 1356) married Asalide (the captaline de Buch), the heiress of Pierre-Amanieu de Bordeaux, captal de Buch, in 1307, the title passed into the Grailly family, a line of fighting seigneurs with origins in Savoy.

The title is best known in connexion with the famous soldier Jean III de Grailly, captal de Buch (r. 1343–1376), the "captal de Buch" par excellence, immortalized by Jean Froissart as the confidant of the Black Prince and the champion of the English cause against France during the first phase of the Hundred Years' War. He played a decisive role as a cavalry leader in the Battle of Poitiers (1356). In 1364, he ravaged the country between Paris and Rouen, but was beaten by Bertrand du Guesclin at the Battle of Cocherel (1364) and taken prisoner. Released next year, he received the seigniory of Nemours and took the oath of fealty to the French king, Charles V, but soon resigned his new fief and returned to his allegiance to the English king. In 1367, he took part in the Battle of Navarrete (1367) in which Du Guesclin was taken prisoner, the captal being entrusted with his safe-keeping. In 1371, Jean de Grailly was appointed constable of Aquitaine, but was taken prisoner next year and interned in the Temple in Paris where, resisting all the tempting offers of the French king, he remained until his death five years later.

References

External links

Buch, Captal de
House of Grailly
Grailly
Medieval titles